WJCL-FM (96.5 FM), known as "Kix 96", is a radio station in Savannah, Georgia, featuring country music. WJCL-FM is a 100,000 watt FM station which serves as the secondary Emergency Alert System radio station for the region.  Its studios are located on Television Circle in Savannah and utilizes a transmitter located west of the city in unincorporated Chatham County.

History
The station was founded by J. Curtis Lewis, Jr., who operated the radio station in conjunction with WJCL-TV on the south side of Savannah, adjacent to his car dealership. The call letters are the founder's initials. Lewis, a former mayor of Savannah, sold the TV station in 1999 to Grapevine Communications. The current owner of the radio station is Cumulus Broadcasting.

For most of its history, WJCL-FM featured easy listening music and was managed by Savannah broadcasting pioneer Al Jennings. Jennings not only managed the station, he was a frequent on-air presence, voicing numerous commercials, sports reports, and programs featuring big band music and nostalgia. A personal friend of Savannah native son Johnny Mercer, Jennings often paid tribute to the legendary songwriter with radio shows featuring unique insights and trivia.

WJCL-FM was one of the first radio stations in the area to use an automation system to play music and commercials, following WEAS-FM's earlier attempts in the late 1960s, which were a failure. During morning and afternoon drive times, live announcers were used, and the easy listening format was expanded to include adult contemporary and light rock music.

Other notable personalities on the station in its early years included Ben Mayo, host of an afternoon program called "Music with Mayo," Joe Cox, famous to a generation of Savannahians as weatherman "Cap'n Sandy," Charlie Solomons, who played drums in a local big band and featured big band music on his morning show, and Pete Preston, who was also a weathercaster on WJCL-TV. Morning and afternoon news updates were read by veteran local newscaster Richard Lantz.

The station turned to country music in the early 1990s as KIX 96, later to be shortened to KIX 96. Notable DJs included Big Mac, Bill West, Tyler Morgan, Jay Scott, Boomer Lee, Mike Miller and Laura Anderson. The station was a powerhouse taking the country lead in the market as the other country station in Savannah, WCHY, (now known as WQBT) went into decline. The station was live assist for the majority of its existence. It became "Nash FM" in 2013. On December 4, 2015, WJCL-FM dropped the "Nash FM" branding and reverted to its former "Kix 96" branding.

References

External links
WJCL official website

Country radio stations in the United States
JCL-FM
Radio stations established in 1972
1972 establishments in Georgia (U.S. state)
Cumulus Media radio stations